Piet Metman (14 June 1916 – 28 March 1990) was a Dutch swimmer. He competed in the men's 100 metre backstroke at the 1936 Summer Olympics.

References

External links
 

1916 births
1990 deaths
Dutch male backstroke swimmers
Olympic swimmers of the Netherlands
Swimmers at the 1936 Summer Olympics
People from Sukabumi
20th-century Dutch people